Nadezhda Kharchenko (born 27 March 1987) is a former Russian football midfielder, who played for Zorky Krasnogorsk in the Russian Championship.

She is a member of the Russian national team, and took part in the 2009 European Championship. As an Under-19 international she won the 2005 U-19 Euro.

Titles
 2005 Under-19 European Championship
 2 Russian Leagues (2005, 2010)
 4 Russian Cups (2005, 2008, 2009, 2010)

References

1987 births
Living people
Russian women's footballers
Russia women's international footballers
CSK VVS Samara (women's football club) players
WFC Rossiyanka players
Women's association football midfielders
FC Zorky Krasnogorsk (women) players
21st-century Russian women
Russian Women's Football Championship players